Kaya ni Mister, Kaya ni Misis is a Philippine family-romance comedy of "now you see them sweet, now you don't" couple. It stars Maricel Soriano and Cesar Montano. It aired on ABS-CBN from May 19, 1997 to September 3, 2001, replacing The Maricel Drama Special. The program was loosely based on the movie Kung Kaya Mo, Kaya Ko Rin that was also starred by Soriano and Montano, released in 1996. It was replaced by Mary D' Potter.

Cast
 Maricel Soriano as Mary Magtanggol
 Cesar Montano as Buboy Magtanggol
 Nova Villa as Gregoria "Goring" Magtanggol
 Luis Gonzales as Luisito/Louie/Galang
 Bayani Agbayani as Joe Tyson
 Izza Ignacio as Magdalena/Elena/Reyna
 Meryl Soriano as Betchay
 Eman Abeleda as Junjun
 Miggui Moreno as Miggui
 Nicole Andersson as Renee
 Sammy Lagmay as Tiyong Boogie
 Bentong as Bentong
 Carding Castro as Mario
 Edcel Cau as Boy Dumi

Guest Cast 
Gary Lising
Anthony Roquel
Bembol Roco
Angelika Dela Cruz
Wowie De Guzman
Sunshine Cruz
Malou De Guzman
CJ Ramos
Cheska Garcia
Stephen Alonzo
Jolina Magdangal
Rez Cortez
Lu Veloso
Hideo Noguchi
Richard Quan
Rey Kilay
Vivorah
Martin Mijares
Arnell Tamayo
Carmina Villaroel
Joel Torre
Jaime Fabregas
Rita Avila
Tirso Cruz III
Carol Banawa
Efren Reyes Jr.
Romnick Sarmenta
Emilio Garcia
Jestoni Alarcon
Berting Labra
April Boy Regino
Mon Confiado
Carmi Martin
Lito Legaspi
Romy Diaz

See also
List of programs broadcast by ABS-CBN
Bida si Mister, Bida si Misis

ABS-CBN original programming
Philippine television sitcoms
1997 Philippine television series debuts
2001 Philippine television series endings
1990s Philippine television series
Filipino-language television shows